UFC 13: The Ultimate Force was a mixed martial arts event held by the Ultimate Fighting Championship on May 30, 1997 in Augusta, Georgia. The event was seen live on pay-per-view in the United States, and later released on home video.

History
UFC 13 featured two four man tournaments, a heavyweight tournament for fighters 200 lb or more, and a lightweight tournament for fighters under 200 lb, as well as two alternate bouts and a Superfight between Vitor Belfort and Tank Abbott.

This was the first appearance of two future UFC Champions and UFC Hall of Fame members Randy Couture and Tito Ortiz, who was an alternate in the lightweight tournament.

The show also featured the first and only UFC appearance of Tony Halme who had previously been a professional wrestler with World Wrestling Entertainment (then World Wrestling Federation) under the name of Ludvig Borga.

Bruce Buffer returned to announce the fights, after making his initial debut as an announcer at UFC 10.

This was the second UFC event to have two tournaments instead of one following UFC 12.

Results

UFC 13 Lightweight Tournament Bracket

1 Tito Ortiz replaced Enson Inoue who withdrew due to injury.

UFC 13 Heavyweight Tournament Bracket

See also 
 Ultimate Fighting Championship
 List of UFC champions
 List of UFC events
 1997 in UFC

References

External links
UFC 13 results at Sherdog.com
UFC 13 fights reviews
Official UFC website

Ultimate Fighting Championship events
1997 in mixed martial arts
Mixed martial arts in Georgia (U.S. state)
Sports in Augusta, Georgia
1997 in Georgia (U.S. state)